Pelican Lake may refer to:

Lakes

Canada 
Pelican Lake (Manitoba)
Pelican Lake (Kenora District), Ontario
Pelican Lake (Cochrane District, Ontario)
Pelican Lake (Saskatchewan)

United States 
Pelican Lake in Desha County, Arkansas
Pelican Lake (Marin County, California)
Pelican Lake, Florida
Pelican Lake (Crow Wing County, Minnesota)
Pelican Lake (Grant and Douglas counties, Minnesota)
Pelican Lake (St. Louis County, Minnesota)
Pelican Lake (Otter Tail County, Minnesota)
Pelican Lake (Codington County, South Dakota)
Pelican Lake (Lake County, South Dakota)
Pelican Lake (Oneida County, Wisconsin)

Places
Pelican Lake Township, Grant County, Minnesota, United States
Pelican Lake, Wisconsin, United States

Other uses
Pelican Lake First Nation, Saskatchewan, Canada

See also
Pelican Lagoon, South Australia
Pelican Lagoon Conservation Park, South Australia